Michel McQueen Martin is an American journalist and correspondent for National Public Radio and WNET. After ten years in print journalism, Martin has become best known for her radio and television news broadcasting on national topics.

Background
A Brooklyn, New York native, Michel McQueen attended St. Paul's School in Concord, New Hampshire as part of the fifth class of women to graduate from the formerly all-male school. In 1980, Martin graduated cum laude from Radcliffe College of Harvard University. In 2016, Martin earned a Master of Arts from Wesley Theological Seminary in Washington D.C.

News career
After working the local news beat for The Washington Post and becoming White House correspondent for The Wall Street Journal, Martin joined ABC News in 1992.

At ABC, Martin reported for Nightline, and was awarded an Emmy for a report that aired on Day One. In 2001, she hosted the PBS show Life 360. Beginning in April 2007, she hosted Tell Me More for National Public Radio (NPR) for seven years, focusing on topics of race, religion, and spirituality. Upon the announcement by NPR of the cancellation of Tell Me More, to be effective August 1, 2014, Martin criticized NPR leadership for failure to institutionalize support for the program and questioned NPR's commitment to serving African-American listeners and other people of color, admitting that she had "scar tissue" as a result of the cancellation. She and the show's producer, Carline Watson, remained with the network as "part of an initiative to incorporate the kind of coverage of issues of race, identity, faith, gender and family that appear on the show." Since 2015, Martin has been the host of Weekend All Things Considered. She is also known for her panel appearances on Real Time with Bill Maher.

In 2010, Martin and MSNBC anchor David Shuster taped a pilot episode for a proposed news and opinion show for CNN.

Since 2018, Martin has been a correspondent for WNET's Amanpour & Company.

Personal life
Martin is married to attorney Billy Martin. They share twins, as well as two grown daughters from her husband's previous marriage.

Awards
 Candace Award, National Coalition of 100 Black Women, 1992.
 Emmy Award, ABC newsmagazine Day One, for her coverage of the international campaign to ban landmines
 Joan Barone Award for Excellence in Washington-based National Affairs/Public Policy Broadcasting from the Radio and Television Correspondents' Association
 2002 Silver Gavel Award, given by the American Bar Association
 Emmy nomination with Robert Krulwich for an ABC News program examining children's racial attitudes
 American Academy of Arts and Sciences Fellow of 2019.

References

External links
Biodata, abcnews.go.com
September 2014 interview, Salon.com
Biodata, npr.org

Year of birth missing (living people)
Living people
Radcliffe College alumni
Wesley Theological Seminary alumni
African-American women journalists
African-American journalists
American women television journalists
American radio reporters and correspondents
NPR personalities
People from Brooklyn
St. Paul's School (New Hampshire) alumni
Journalists from New York City
Place of birth missing (living people)
American women radio journalists
21st-century African-American people
21st-century African-American women